Gentiana septemfida, the crested gentian or summer gentian, is a species of flowering plant in the family Gentianaceae, native to the Caucasus and Turkey. It requires a rich, moist soil and full sun.

The Latin specific epithet septemfida means "with seven divisions".

In cultivation this plant and the darker-flowered variety G. septemfida var. lagodechiana have gained the Royal Horticultural Society's Award of Garden Merit.

References

septemfida
Flora of the Caucasus